The 1971 France rugby union tour of South Africa was a series of matches played by the France national rugby union team in South Africa in June 1971. The French team drew one and lost one of their international matches against the South Africa national rugby union team.

Results
Scores and results list France's points tally first.

References

1971 rugby union tours
1971 
1971 in South African rugby union
1970–71 in French rugby union